Paragliding at the 2011 Southeast Asian Games were held at Gunung Mas, Jakarta.

Medal summary

Men

Women

Medal table

External links
  2011 Southeast Asian Games

2011 Southeast Asian Games events